The Basilica of Superga is a church in Superga, in the vicinity of Turin.

History
It was built from 1717 to 1731 for Victor Amadeus II of Savoy, designed by Filippo Juvarra, at the top of the hill of Superga. This fulfilled a vow the duke (and future King of Sardinia) had made during the Battle of Turin, after defeating the besieging French army in the War of the Spanish Succession. The architect alluded to earlier styles while adding a baroque touch. The church contains the tombs of many princes and kings of the House of Savoy, including the Monument to Carlo Emanuele III (1733) by Ignazio Collino and his brother Filippo. Under the church are the tombs of the Savoy family, including most of its members, among them Charles Albert.

This church by Juvarra is considered late Baroque-Classicism. The dome was completed in 1726 and resembles some elements of Michelangelo's dome at St. Peter's Basilica. This is no coincidence as Juvarra studied and worked in Rome for ten years prior to working in Turin. The temple front protrudes from a dome structure citing the Pantheon. The temple front is larger than typical proportions because the Superga is set upon this hill. It is also believed that Victor Amadeus wanted the basilica to rest on this hill as reminder of the power of the Savoy family as well as continue a line of sight to the existing Castle of Rivoli. Later, the Palazzina di caccia of Stupinigi completed the triangle between the three residences of Savoy.

The Royal Crypt of Superga is the burial place of the Savoy family.

The history of the church can be traced to 2 September 1706, when Duke Victor Amadeus II of Savoy and the Prince of Carignano, Eugene of Savoy climbed the hill to see Turin besieged by Franco-Spanish forces during the War of the Spanish Succession. Victor Amadeus, having knelt down in front of an old prop, swore that, in case of victory, he would have a monument built to our Lady (the Virgin Mary). From dawn until the early hours of the afternoon of 7 September the armies clashed in the fields at Jaya and Madonna di Campagna. Piedmontese armies achieved victory over the French. After Victor Amedeus was crowned King of Sicily he entrusted the design of this building to Filippo Juvarra.

The mountain on which the Basilica is found was the site of the Superga air disaster of Grande Torino football team in 1949.

Royal crypt
The Royal crypt is the traditional burial place of members of the House of Savoy, successively Dukes of Savoy, Kings of Sardinia and Kings of Italy. Two kings of Italy, Victor Emmanuel II and Umberto I, have been interred in the Pantheon, Rome. The earlier generations of the House of Savoy as well as the last king of Italy, Umberto II, are buried in Hautecombe Abbey, the ancestral burial site of the family in Savoy.

See also
 History of early modern period domes

References

Sources

Further reading
 Padre Benedetto Marengo, La Basilica di Superga. Cenni storici del più grande monumento juvarriano, Tipografia Scarafaglio, Torino, 1997
 Reina Gabriele, Guadalupi Gianni, Superga segreta. Il Mausoleo dei Savoia, Omega, 2008,

External links

official site

Churches completed in 1731
House of Savoy
Superga
Baroque architecture in Turin
Filippo Juvarra buildings
Burial sites of the House of Austria-Este
Burial sites of the House of Savoy
Superga